Plymouth railway station serves the city of Plymouth, Devon, England. It is on the northern edge of the city centre, close to the North Cross roundabout. It Is the second busiest station in the county of Devon, and is the largest of the six surviving stations in Plymouth.

The station is managed by Great Western Railway. Services are operated by Great Western Railway and CrossCountry.

History

Originally named Plymouth North Road, it was opened in 1877 as a joint station for the Great Western Railway (GWR) and the London and South Western Railway (LSWR). It was expanded in 1908 but a major rebuilding scheme that started in 1938 was delayed by the Second World War and was not completed until 1962. John Betjeman commented unfavourably on its new form in his introduction to The Book of the Great Western: Plymouth (North Road) dullest of stations and no less dull now it has been rebuilt in copybook contemporary.

The first railway station in Plymouth was opened by the South Devon Railway on 2 April 1849 at Millbay, on the site now occupied by the Plymouth Pavilions. This company amalgamated with the GWR in 1876, just as the LSWR was completing its rival route from London to Plymouth.  North Road station was opened on 28 March 1877 to provide a joint facility for trains of both companies.  It was just west of the earlier Mutley railway station, while at its west end a new junction allowed direct access to the Cornwall Railway and the LSWR's Devonport Kings Road railway station.

The station was built of wood and the platforms were fully covered by train sheds. It originally had just two through platforms but additional platforms were added in a scheme executed in 1908.  Further major rebuilding work started in 1938; one signal box was replaced and the second moved to make way for the new works, and  Houndiscombe Road bridge at the east end of the station was rebuilt. Work was soon stopped due to the Second World War but on North Road was increased when Millbay station had to be closed to passengers in 1941 following an air raid.

The old LSWR Friary station was closed from 15 September 1958, following which North Road was renamed as just 'Plymouth'.

The rebuilding work was resumed in 1956 to the designs of architect Howard Cavanagh and Ian Campbell and the new station with its large office block, 'Intercity House', was formally opened by Dr Richard Beeching, the British Railways Chairman, on 26 March 1962. The office block was intended to be the northern point of Armada Way, counterbalancing the tower of the Civic Centre at the southern end, in the Abercrombie/Paton-Watson 'Plan for Plymouth'.  The station now had seven through platforms, although two of these were converted to terminal bay platforms in 1974.  One of these at the west end is usually used for the Tamar Valley Line service but the longer east end bays were used for parcels and for Royal Mail trains until the withdrawal of this traffic from the area in 2003.  Outside the station a car park was provided, which was rebuilt in its current multistorey form in the 1970s. In recent times there have been updates to the station.

South West Trains operated two trains per day to and from London Waterloo, one weekend service would continue to Penzance, but South West Trains services were withdrawn beyond Exeter St Davids in December 2009.

Accidents and incidents 
On 3 April 2016, Class 150 diesel multiple unit 150219 collided with a stationary InterCity 125 High Speed Train at platform 6. Class 43 power car 43160 and the DMU were damaged. Forty-six people were injured; one seriously.

GWR stationmasters

Alfred Pearse 1877 - 1880 (formerly station master at Exeter St Thomas, afterwards station master at Slough)
Thomas C. Jenkin from 1880 (formerly station master at Exeter St Thomas)
Robert Davis 1882 - 1883  (afterwards station master at Oxford)
Gustavus Bell 1883 - ca. 1891
Stephen Alfred Hunt until 1904 
Daniel Bailey 1904 - 1911 (formerly station master at St Austell)
Albert John Humphrey from 1911 
A.P. Watkins 1914 -1920 (afterwards station master at Taunton)
Henry Isaac Brereton 1920 - 1924 (formerly station master at Pen-y-graig)
J.R.C. Williams 1924 - 1928
H.F. Kelly 1928 - 1933
Martin Blewett 1933 - 1938
G.E. Nailor 1938 - 1942 (formerly station master at Chippenham, afterwards station master at Swindon)
G.H. Anthony from 1942 - ca. 1950

Platform layout

The station has its entrance on the south side which gives access to the city centre. The west side of the station concourse is the ticket office, while on the north and east sides are various retail outlets selling food and newspapers. The buffet on Platforms 7 and 8 is no longer in operation however there is a small café just beyond the ticket barriers serving hot drinks and hot food. The platform area is separated from the concourse by the ticket gates.

The platforms that can be reached on the level from the concourse are numbered 1 to 4. Platforms 1 and 2 are east-facing bay platforms, not used by passenger trains.

The remaining platforms are reached by a subway immediately inside the ticket gates; there are lifts to the subway on each of the groups of platforms.  They are all through tracks and are signalled so that trains can arrive and depart in either direction.  Platform 4 is used by most through services towards Penzance, but also for some trains towards London. Platforms 5 and 6  are either side of the middle island platform and are used by a variety of services, including Great Western Railway local trains and long distance CrossCountry services. Platforms 7 and 8 are either side of a second island platform; there is a small coffee shop facing the subway steps on this platform. Most Great Western Railway services to London Paddington depart from platform 7, but both these platforms are used by a variety of services from Cornwall towards London and the North as well as some local services.

Beyond Platform 8 are two tracks, known as Park Sidings, which are used for stabling trains between services, but most trains are nowadays kept on the platform tracks between arrival and departure.  There are some more sidings adjacent to platform 1. There is an extra track between platforms 4 and 5 for through goods trains and shunting manoeuvres.

Services

Services between London Paddington to Plymouth are at least hourly throughout the day. A number of named trains operate on this route including the Cornish Riviera, a fast London to Penzance daytime service, and the overnight Night Riviera service on the same route.

Most CrossCountry trains from Scotland and the North of England via Bristol terminate at Plymouth, although a few continue to Penzance or, on summer weekends, Newquay.

Passenger volume
Comparing the year from April 2008 to that which started in April 2002, passenger numbers increased by 97%. However, recent years have seen little further growth.

The statistics cover twelve month periods that start in April.

Signalling 
The station was originally controlled from two signal boxes. "North Road East" was on the north side of the line to the east of the station, while "North Road West" was on the south side of the line at the west end of the station where it could control the junction of the original lines to Millbay with the new Cornwall Loop Line to Devonport. The adjacent signal boxes were at Mutley to the east, Cornwall Junction on the Millbay line, and Devonport Junction at the far end of the Cornwall Loop.

Both of the North Road signal boxes were closed in November 1908 and replaced by new ones with the same names. The West box was now on the north side of the line and had 59 levers, while the East box needed just 48. Mutley box closed at the same time, the next box now being at Mannamead on the other side of Mutley Tunnel, which had opened about three years earlier.

The rebuilding work of 1938 meant more signalling alterations. On 22 January 1938, the timber West box was lifted up and moved to a new position clear of the proposed works, being brought back into use on 27 January 1938. At the other end of the station the East box was closed and a new  structure built, again on the north side of the line, which was brought into use on 25 June 1939.

Both signal boxes were closed on 26 November 1960 when a new "Plymouth Panel Signal Box" was opened on the west end of the new Platform 1; the West box was subsequently demolished. Multiple-aspect signals have controlled movements of trains throughout the Plymouth area since the opening of this new signal box in 1960. The adjacent boxes were initially at Laira Junction in the east and Keyham in the west. Towards the end of 1973 several more signal boxes were closed eastwards from Plymouth, which meant that Plymouth controlled trains until they reached the outer signal of Totnes Signal Box. Totnes box closed on 9 November 1987 when a new panel signal box at Exeter was opened.

See also

Railways in Plymouth

References

Further reading

External links
 BBC archive films: Plymouth to Dartmoor train
 Video footage of Plymouth station

Railway stations in Plymouth, Devon
Railway stations in Great Britain opened in 1877
Railway stations served by Great Western Railway
Railway stations served by CrossCountry
Former Great Western Railway stations
Former London and South Western Railway stations
Railway stations in Great Britain opened in 1962
Howard Cavanagh railway stations
Ian Campbell railway stations
DfT Category C1 stations